Chiesa di Santa Maria ad Cryptas (Italian for Church of Santa Maria ad Cryptas)  is a  Middle Ages church in Fossa, Province of L'Aquila (Abruzzo).

History 

The church suffered slight damage from the 2009 earthquake.

Architecture

References

External links

Maria ad Cryptas
Romanesque architecture in Abruzzo
Fossa, Abruzzo